Inkishush or Inkišuš (fl. late 3rd millennium BC) was the first Gutian ruler of the Gutian Dynasty mentioned on the Sumerian King List. According to this list, he was the successor of Imta. Sarlagab then succeeded Inkishush.

See also

 History of Sumer
 List of Mesopotamian dynasties

References

Sumerian kings
22nd-century BC rulers
Gutian dynasty of Sumer